Nicholas Beckett (born 9 November 1987) is a Jamaican international footballer who plays for Harbour View, as a midfielder.

Career
Beckett has played club football for Harbour View.

He made his international debut for Jamaica in 2014.

References

1987 births
Living people
Jamaican footballers
Jamaica international footballers
Association football midfielders
Harbour View F.C. players
National Premier League players